Cleomella longipes, the Chiricahua Mountain stinkweed, is a plant species native to northern Mexico and to the southwestern United States. It has been reported from Chihuahua, San Luis Potosí, trans-Pecos Texas, New Mexico (Grant and Hidalgo Counties) Arizona (Cochise County). It is found on saline or alkaline flats at elevations of 500–1000 m.

Cleomella longipes is a sparsely-branched annual herb up to 80 cm tall. Leaves are narrowly elliptic, up to 5 cm long. Flowers are borne in racemes at the top of the plant and on the tips of branches. Sepals are green, petals yellow, up to 9 mm long and 4 mm wide.

References

longipes
Flora of Arizona
Flora of New Mexico
Flora of San Luis Potosí
Flora of Texas
Flora of Chihuahua (state)